Selby was a parliamentary constituency in North Yorkshire, represented in the House of Commons of the Parliament of the United Kingdom. It elected one Member of Parliament (MP) by the first past the post system of election.

The constituency existed from 1983 to 2010.

History
This was a safe Conservative seat from 1983 to 1997 then became a Labour marginal for the remainder of its existence.

Boundaries
1983–1997: The District of Selby, and the District of Ryedale ward of Osbaldwick and Heworth.

1997–2010: The District of Selby.

The constituency covered the district of Selby and the south-eastern suburbs of the city of York (namely the parishes of Fulford, Heslington and Osbaldwick and Heworth Without). It included the University of York and the Drax and Eggborough power stations.

Boundary review
Following their review of parliamentary representation in York and North Yorkshire in the 2000s, the Boundary Commission for England created a new seat of Selby and Ainsty.  The new seat consists of much of the former Selby constituency, minus the south-western suburbs of York which are included in the (also newly created) seat of York Outer, plus rural areas south and east of Harrogate formerly included in the Vale of York constituency.

Members of Parliament

Elections

Elections in the 2000s

Elections in the 1990s

Elections in the 1980s

See also
List of parliamentary constituencies in North Yorkshire

Notes and references

Constituencies of the Parliament of the United Kingdom established in 1983
Constituencies of the Parliament of the United Kingdom disestablished in 2010
Politics of North Yorkshire
Parliamentary constituencies in Yorkshire and the Humber (historic)
Selby District